Luancheng Subdistrict (t , s , p Luánchéng, postal Lanchou) is a subdistrict in Luanzhou, Hebei Province, China.

It was connected to the China Railway Company's network in 1892 and was involved in the First Zhili–Fengtian War during China's Warlord era.

See also
List of township-level divisions of Hebei

Township-level divisions of Hebei
Tangshan